Thailand's Got Talent ไทยแลนด์ก็อตทาเลนต์ (also known as TGT), is a Thai reality television series on the television network, and part of the global British Got Talent series. It is a talent show that features singers, dancers, sketch artists, comedians and other performers of all ages competing for the advertised top prize of 10,000,000 Baht (approximately $325,000). The show debuted in March 2011. Thailand is also the fifth country in Asia to license Got Talent series. The four judges Pongsak Rattanaphong, Cris Horwang, Jennifer Kim and Yuhtlerd Sippapak join hosts Ketsepsawat Palagawongse na Ayutthaya.

The winner of the first season was Myra Maneepatsorn Molloy, a 13-year-old singer, who took home the first place prize of 10,000,000 Baht (approximately $325,000).

Presenters and judges

Presenters

Judging

Show format
Contestants must show their ability within 2–4 minutes of the board where four judges will watch the performance. If not satisfied, they may hit their buzzer which lights up and X, and with four Xs, the audition would immediately be stopped where the judges may deliberate if the performer may go through.

Season overview

Season 1 (2011)

It is a talent show that features singers, dancers, sketch artists, comedians and other performers of all ages competing for the advertised top prize of 10,000,000 Baht (approximately $325,000). The show debuted in March 2011. Thailand is also the fifth country in Asia to license Got Talent series. The three judges Pinyo Rutham, Benz Pornchita Na Songkla and Nirut Sirijanya join hosts Krit Sribhumisret and Ketsepsawat Palagawongse na Ayutthaya. As of now, the first season has concluded airing and the show is currently on hiatus for its second season.

The winner of the first season is Myra Maneepatsorn Molloy, a 13 year old singer, who performed a combination of cross-over classical and Broadway songs.

Season 2 (2012)

This Season Support by Rexona.This season is the first season without judge Nirut Sirijanya who was replaced with radio personality Jirayut Watthanasin. It is a talent show that features singers, dancers, sketch artists, comedians and other performers of all ages competing for the advertised top prize of 10,000,000 Baht (approximately $325,000).

The winner of the second season is Leng Rajanikara Keawdee, who performed an Aerial Acrobatics.

Season 3 (2013)
There was the big scandal of this season during the on-air on June 2, 2013.

Season 4 (2014)

Season 5 (2015)

Season 6 (2016)

Season 7 (2018)

Controversies

External links 
 Thailand's Got Talent website (in Thai)

References 

2011 Thai television series debuts
Thailand's Got Talent seasons
Television series by Workpoint Entertainment
Thai reality television series
Television series by Fremantle (company)
2010s Thai television series
Thai television series based on British television series
Channel 3 (Thailand) original programming
Workpoint TV original programming